Arland F. Christ-Janer (January 22, 1922 – November 8, 2008) was an academic who served as the president of a number of educational institutions, including as president of the College Entrance Examination Board and as the sixth president of Boston University.

Christ-Janer was born in Nebraska and received his Bachelor of Arts at Carleton College. He also earned degrees at Yale Divinity School and the University of Chicago. During World War II he served in the Pacific as a bombardier in the 39th Bomb Group (VH),  a U.S. Army Air Force B29 squadron.

At the beginning of his career he was an administrator for Lake Erie College and later Saint John's College. 1962 marked his transfer to Cornell College as its president.  During his time as president of Boston University, from 1967 to 1970, the school was facing much political turmoil from the Students for a Democratic Society and one of the schools African American organizations. At the time of Christ-Janer's inauguration both organizations protested with a sit-in in the presidential office. Although Christ-Janer made attempts to quell the turmoil at the school, ultimately his efforts proved to be unsuccessful and he resigned in July 1970.

Even though 1970 marked a difficult conclusion to his time at Boston University, Christ-Janer was to be appointed as College Entrance Examination Board's president in the same year. In 1973 he moved to Florida where he was inaugurated as the president of New College located in Sarasota, Florida. He relocated to Missouri in 1975 where he served as the president of Stephens College.

His final academic position was held at the Ringling College of Art and Design (latter, Ringling School of Design) where he was inaugurated as president in 1984. Under Christ-Janer's presidency, the schools endowment was raised to the highest level in its history, the campus was renovated and school began offering four year degrees. He retired in 1996 and served on the board of the Ringling Art Museum until his death in 2008.

Published works
Memories of Arland F. Christ Janer

References

 https://web.archive.org/web/20121021015436/http://www.yale.edu/divinity/notes/081114/notes_081119_about.shtml

1922 births
2008 deaths
People from Seward County, Nebraska
Carleton College alumni
Presidents of Boston University
University of Chicago alumni
Yale Divinity School alumni
United States Army Air Forces soldiers
New College of Florida faculty
Cornell College faculty
Stephens College faculty
St. John's College (Annapolis/Santa Fe) faculty
United States Army Air Forces personnel of World War II
20th-century American academics